Mykola Redkin (born 10 June 1928) is a Ukrainian former athlete. He competed in the men's hammer throw at the 1952 Summer Olympics, representing the Soviet Union.

References

External links
  

1928 births
Possibly living people
Athletes (track and field) at the 1952 Summer Olympics
Ukrainian male hammer throwers
Olympic athletes of the Soviet Union
Sportspeople from Dnipro
Soviet male hammer throwers